Rathenau is a German locational surname, named after the obsolete spelling for the town of Rathenow in Brandenburg. The name may refer to:

Emil Rathenau (1838–1915), German industrialist
Gerhart Rathenau (1911–1989), Dutch scientist
Walther Rathenau (1867–1922), German industrialist and politician

Other uses
Walther Rathenau Institut, a thinktank in Berlin

See also
Ratner (disambiguation)

German-language surnames
Jewish-German families